The 1977–78 Marquette Warriors men's basketball team represented the Marquette University in the 1977–78 season. The Warriors finished the regular season with a record of 24–4. The Warriors would receive an at-large bid into the NCAA Tournament where they would fall in the first round to Miami (OH).

Roster

Schedule

References 

Marquette
Marquette Golden Eagles men's basketball seasons
Marquette
Marquette
Marquette